P. Suresh Unnithan (born 30 July 1956) is an Indian film and television director who works in Malayalam films. His most popular works are Mukha Chithram, Utsavamelam , Jaathakam, Bhagyavan, Aardram.

Biography

His start in film was as an assistant director to Padmarajan, the most renowned film director, from whom he learned the basics and craft of film making. Later he debuted with Jaathakam, which was well acclaimed by the critics and was a huge hit. The same film won the Best Newcomer Director award at the Kerala State Film Awards. Later he directed films like Radhamadhavam, Aardram, Mukha Chitram, Uthsava melam, Sathyaparatinja, Bhagyavaan, Thovalapookkal, Rishya Sringan and others. He entered the television industry and had some hit serials. His 2004 serial project Swamy Ayyappan was the most popular and top rated serial in Malayalam.

After 12 years break Suresh Unnithan made a comeback with Ayaal, with Lal and Iniya playing the leads.

His son Abhiram Suresh Unnithan is also a film maker.

Awards

 Kerala State Film Award for Best Debut Director (1989) – Jaathakam
 Kerala film critics award for Best Director (1991) – Radhamadhavam
Asianet TV awards for Best Director(2008) -Swami Ayyappan
 Kerala State Film Award – Special Mention in Direction (2014)- Ayaal

Television
Director
Verpadukalude Viralpadukal (DD)
Vegatha Pora Pora (DD)
Sthree Oru Santhwanam (Asianet) 
Ezham Kadalinakkare(Asianet)
Krishna Kripa Sagaram (Asianet)
Swami Ayyappan (TV series) (Asianet)
Sreekrishnaleela (Asianet)
Sreemahabhagavatham (Asianet)
Sreepadmanabham (Amrita Tv) 
Thulabharam (Surya TV)
Bhadra (Surya TV)
Shivakami (Surya TV)

Producer banner- Rohini vision/ sree movies
Vasundhara medicals (Asianet)
 Snehadooram (Asianet)
Tadankalpalayam (Asianet)
Sindhooracheppu (Amrita tv)
Kunjali marakkar (Asianet)
Lipstick (Asianet)
 Amala (Mazhavil Manorama)
Viswaroopam (Flowers TV)
 Manjurukum kaalam (Mazhavil Manorama)
 Krishnathulasi (Mazhavil Manorama)
 Sthreepadham (Mazhavil Manorama)
 Manjil Virinja Poovu (Mazhavil Manorama)
Jeevithanouka (Mazhavil Manorama)
Kalyani (Mazhavil Manorama)

Filmography
 1989 Jaathakam                    - Jayaram, Sithara, Madhu, Sukumaran, Innocent, Kaviyoor Ponnamma
 1990 Radha Madhavam                - Thilakan, Jayaram, Geetha, Parvathy
 1991 Sathyaprathinja          - Murali, Urvashi
 1991 Mukha Chithram            - Jayaram, Sunitha, Siddique, Urvasi, Jagadeesh, Nedumudi Venu
 1992 Utsavamelam                 - Suresh Gopi, Urvasi, Narendra Prasad , Innocent
 1992 Aardram                      - Murali, Sunitha, Urvasi
 1993 Bhagyavan - Sreenivasan, Jagathy Sreekumar Vijayaraghavan
 1995 Thovalapookkal               - Jagathy Sreekumar, Urvashi
 1997 Rishyasringan
 2013 Ayaal - Lal , Lena, Iniya , Sukumari
 2021 Kshanam - Lal, Bharath, Baiju Santhosh

References

Indian television directors
Malayalam film directors
Living people
1956 births
20th-century Indian film directors
Indian television producers
People from Pathanamthitta district
People from Pandalam
Film directors from Kerala
Television personalities from Kerala